Fraser McConnell (born September 9, 1998) is a Jamaican professional racing driver. McConnell is the most competitively successful Jamaican driver in the history of international rallycross racing—his championship victory in the 2019 Americas RallyCross Championship marked the first and only championship win by a Jamaican driver in the series’ history. In 2021, McConnell became the first and only Jamaican to claim a supercar victory in the Rally X Nordic league. In 2021, McConnell's debut supercar campaign received public recognition from Usain Bolt and Jamaican Prime Minister Andrew Holness.

McConnell currently competes professionally Dreyer & Reinbold Racing in the Group E class.

Early life 
McConnell was born in Bog Walk in St. Catherine, Jamaica. McConnell began karting, motocross, and rally at the age of eight. He achieved early success throughout his junior career, being named Jamaican Driver of the Year twice, and later claiming victory at Jamaica's nationally competitive Dover Race Track at the age of 16.

Racing career 
McConnell made his rallycross career debut in 2018, competing in North America's ARX2 series. In his first race, McConnell recorded the fastest-out-of-the-box time, and ultimately reached the final four times out of five. In the final round of the season, McConnell achieved a podium finish.

In 2019, McConnell made his international racing debut with Olsbergs MSE. That same year, McConnell won the ARX2 championship, marking the first time in history for a Jamaican to lift the title.

In 2021, McConnell secured his first supercar victory, defeating three-time FIA world champion Johan Kristoffersson at the RallyX Nordic in Nysum, Denmark.

McConnell will joining Lewis Hamilton's Team X44 in Extreme E for the 2023 season. He will be replacing Sébastien Loeb and will partner Cristina Gutiérrez.

References 

1998 births
Jamaican racing drivers
Living people
People from Saint Catherine Parish
Dreyer & Reinbold Racing drivers
Extreme E drivers